Steel Hammer is a 2009 composition for three sopranos and chamber ensemble by the American composer Julia Wolfe.  It was first performed on November 21, 2009, at Zankel Hall by the contemporary classical music groups Bang on a Can and Trio Mediæval.  The piece is based on the ballad of the African-American tall tale John Henry.  The composition was a finalist for the 2010 Pulitzer Prize for Music.

Composition
The text of the piece is drawn from over 200 versions of the John Henry folklore.  Wolfe described her sources in the score program notes, writing:

Structure
The piece has a duration of 79 minutes and is composed in nine movements:
Some Say 
The States 
Destiny 
Mountain 
Characteristics 
Polly Ann 
The Race 
Winner 
Lord Lord

Instrumentation
The work is scored for an ensemble comprising three sopranos, clarinet, percussion, guitar, piano, cello, and double bass.

Reception
Reviewing the world premiere,  of The Washington Post praised the piece as "an astonishingly compelling amalgam" of music and noise.  Daniel Stephen Johnson of WQXR-FM said, "At its best, the music of Julia Wolfe is totally relentless, like a steam-powered drill boring a great hole right through the hard heart of a mountain."  He added, "A bit like The Little Match Girl Passion of fellow Bang on a Can composer David Lang, this is a passion play for a sort of ordinary Christ figure, and their pure, exquisitely shaped sound lends Wolfe's work not a suitable elegiac tone, but the laserlike intensity demanded by her music's most luminous moments."  Allan Kozinn of The New York Times lauded Wolfe's mixture of musical styles and wrote:

References

Compositions by Julia Wolfe
2009 compositions
Chamber music compositions
Music commissioned by Bang on a Can
Music commissioned by Carnegie Hall